Static & Ben El Tavori were an Israeli musical pop duo comprising the singers Liraz Russo (aka 'Static') and Ben El Tavori. Their musical producer was Yarden Peleg (aka 'Jordi').

Biography

Static
Liraz Russo (born 8 December 1990), best known as Static was adopted by an affluent Israeli couple, Moshe and Nitza Russo, at the age of four months, and he was raised Jewish in Haifa, Israel. He does not know his country of birth, although he has mentioned that it is possible he was born in Latin America. He began learning to play the piano at age three, and later switched to guitar. At age 15, he performed in municipal festivals with a Haifa youth band. He did his mandatory military service in the Israel Defense Forces as an officer in the Israeli Air Force, but was discharged early and did not complete full military service due to health reasons. After being discharged, he began working with music producer Omri Segal, which opened doors for him in the music industry. He adopted the stage name "Static", a nickname that had been given to him by a childhood friend. His breakthrough came in 2015, when together with DJ Gal Malka, he released the song "Ba La Lirkod", which entered the Galgalatz playlist and became one of the most successful Israeli songs of the year.

Ben El Tavori

Ben El Tavori (born 22 December 1991) is the son of Israeli singer Shimi Tavori and Aviva (née Azulay). Their family is of Mizrahi Jewish (Yemenite-Jewish and Moroccan-Jewish) descent. When he was a child, his parents divorced. In 2005, at age 14, he sang publicly for the first time  with his father. In 2007, at age 16, he auditioned for the seventh season of Kokhav Nolad together with his brother Daniel, but only his brother was accepted. He did his mandatory military service in the Israeli Air Force. In March 2011, he released his debut album. His cooperation with Russo and Peleg on the Ron Nesher song "#DubiGal" is considered his breakthrough.

Jordi
Yarden Peleg (born 20 January 1987), best known as Jordi, was born in Kiryat Motzkin, Israel. His family is Jewish and his parents are Tzvi and Malka Peleg. Peleg's father was a radio broadcaster, and as a child, he visited his father many times at the radio station where he worked. At age 12 he began making music, and at 17, he dropped out of high school and produced his first song. At age 18, he built a recording studio in his home. In 2013, he opened a studio and began working as an independent producer. He worked with various artists, and first met Static while working on a song by the band KYD which also featured Alon De Loco and Static.

Musical collaboration

Static, Tavori, and Jordi cooperated in rapper Ron Nesher's 2015 single "#DubiGal". From then on, Static and Tavori began recording songs together, and Jordi produced their music. Every single by Static & Ben El Tavori has been accompanied by a music video which has received tens of millions of views on YouTube. Their first single "Barbie" was released in November 2015, was a success and entered the Galgalatz playlist, becoming Static's second song and Tavori's first to do so. Three months later they released their second single "Kvish Hachof", about the two's many trips on Israel's coastal road, since Static is from Haifa and Ben El is from Tel Aviv.

Their third song "Silsulim", which came out in June 2016, won the 'Song of the Year' award on Reshet Gimmel's Annual Hebrew song chart for the year 5776. In the Galgalatz chart that year, they won 'Breakthrough of the Year' and 'People of the Year'. In September 2016, they released the song "Stam". Their fifth single "Zahav", together with a 1950s-themed music video, came out in January 2017.

From the fourth season onwards, Static and Ben El have been on the judging team of the reality show HaKokhav HaBa.

In 2017, they won the ACUM Prize in the Inbal Perlmutter 'Achievement of the Year' category. That year they also participated in the Festigal, and appeared in an advertising campaign by the fashion company Castro.

In June 2017, they released the Brazilian-themed song "Tudo Bom" which contains a few words in Portuguese. This song became widely popular in Israel and also drew significant attention from Brazil. The pair were invited to visit the Brazilian Embassy and meet the Brazilian Ambassador to Israel. The song broke the record for the highest number of views of an Israeli song on YouTube in one day. As of December 20, 2017, the total number of views currently sits at over 44 million, also the highest of any Israeli song.

A later single, "Hakol Letova", was released in October 2017. The song broke the record for number of plays of an Israeli song on the radio in one day, with 80, exceeding the previous record of 66, also held by Static and Ben El, with the song Tudo Bom.

In 2018, they released five songs, among them the Japan-themed song "Kawaii" as well as their first English song, "Broke Ass Millionaire", set to the tune of "Silsulim". In March 2018, they signed a ten-year deal with Capitol Records to produce seven international albums in English. They worked with songwriter Emily Wright. However, Israel remained the main focus of their activity.  Four more songs were released in 2019, including an English version of Tudo Bom made in collaboration with J Balvin. Two of their Hebrew singles in 2019 were made in collaboration with Eden Ben Zaken, Stephane Legar, and Marvin Casey.

Seven more singles came out in 2020, including "Further Up (Na, Na, Na, Na, Na)", an English single made in collaboration with Pitbull. Their other English singles of 2020 were "Milli", made in collaboration with Flipp Dinero and "Shake Ya Boom Boom" with will.i.am. In June 2020 they released the song "Habib Alby" with Nasrin Kadri as the official song for Tel Aviv Pride Week in 2020. The song's lyrics alternate between Hebrew and English and contain some Arabic phrases, including the song's name, which means "Love of my Heart" in Arabic. They made four other Hebrew singles in 2020, one of which included an appearance by Miri Mesika and another with Anna Zak. They were among the 40 Israeli artists who were featured in the charity single Katan Aleinu, which Static and Jordi wrote and composed, to support hospitals battling the COVID-19 pandemic.

In June 2021, Static and Ben El released their first album, "Shiva Yerechim" ("Seven Moons"). The album has seven songs, six of which feature a collaboration with another Israeli artist. They also released five singles throughout 2021, including a cover of Roni Duani's Hebrew version of Christine Milton's "Superstar" made in collaboration with several other artists as well as the English song "Bella".

In August 2022, recordings of Tavori were leaked to the public. The recordings, in which Tavori was threatening his ex-wife, Ortal Amar, and their son, Tav-Prince, aroused controversy in Israel. As a result, Static announced On August 25 that the duo had broken up. Their decision was posted on their accounts on the social media, Facebook and Instagram. Their performances that were planned before the breakup, were not canceled and were performed on the day of the breakup in the evening.

Discography

Singles

Seven Moons album

See also
Music of Israel

References

Israeli musical duos
Musical groups established in 2015
Israeli Jews
Jewish Israeli musicians
2015 establishments in Israel